The men's 4 x 400 metres relay event at the 2014 World Junior Championships in Athletics was held in Eugene, Oregon, USA, at Hayward Field on 26 and 27 July.

Medalists

Records

Results

Final
27 July
Start time: 16:56  Temperature: 29 °C  Humidity: 35 %

Note:
IAAF Rule 163.3(b) - Infringement of the inside border
IAAF Rule 170.19 - Starting outside the takeover zone

Intermediate times:
400m: 45.70 
800m: 1:32.51 
1200m: 2:18.27

Heats
26 July
First 2 in each heat (Q) and the next 2 fastest (q) advance to the Final

Summary

Details
First 2 in each heat (Q) and the next 2 fastest (q) advance to the Final

Heat 1
27 July
Start time: 15:31  Temperature: 30 °C  Humidity: 31%

Intermediate times:
400m: 45.52 
800m: 1:32.54 
1200m: 2:18.76

Heat 2
27 July
Start time: 15:41  Temperature: 30 °C  Humidity: 31%

Note:
IAAF Rule 163.3(a) - Lane infringement

Intermediate times:
400m: 47.53 
800m: 1:33.06 
1200m: 2:18.88

Heat 3
27 July
Start time: 15:50  Temperature: 30 °C  Humidity: 31%

Intermediate times:
400m: 46.33 
800m: 1:34.72 
1200m: 2:22.33

Participation
According to an unofficial count, 78 athletes from 18 countries participated in the event.

References

External links
 WJC14 4 x 400 metres reay schedule

4 x 400 metres relay
Relays at the World Athletics U20 Championships